The Ronald Reagan Presidential Library is the repository of presidential records from the administration of Ronald Reagan, the 40th president of the United States, and the burial place of the president and first lady, Nancy Reagan. It is the largest of the 13 federally operated presidential libraries, containing millions of documents, photographs, films and tapes. There is a permanent exhibit covering Ronald Reagan's life, as well as memorabilia such as Air Force One, the aircraft personally used by the president, and a section of masonry from the Berlin Wall.

The library is located in Simi Valley, in Southern California, and was designed by Hugh Stubbins and Associates. It is administered by the National Archives and Records Administration (NARA).

Planning

The first person to propose a site for the Reagan Library was W. Glenn Campbell, director of the Hoover Institution, a conservative think tank much used by Reagan for policy positions. Campbell contacted Reagan in February 1981 to say that the Hoover Institution was willing to host the Reagan Library at their headquarters on the campus of Stanford University in Northern California. The advantage held by Hoover was that Reagan was an honorary fellow, and Hoover already housed Reagan's papers from his campaign for and transition to California governor. Ronald and Nancy Reagan participated in occasional informal discussions about the library plans with Campbell and Stanford President Donald Kennedy through 1982. During this time, a proposal to place the Nixon Library on campus at Duke University in North Carolina was under attack by Duke faculty and the National Archives and Records Administration (NARA) who were all worried that the Richard Nixon Foundation would not allow scholarly access to archives, which they judged was the primary purpose of a presidential library. The Duke faculty were also firmly against having a museum serve as a memorial to Nixon who had left office in disgrace. This public controversy shaped the discussions about a Reagan Library at Stanford. Reagan hosted the Hoover Institution at the White House in January 1982, telling them, "You built the knowledge base that made the changes now taking place in Washington possible."

Reagan formally accepted the Hoover Institution invitation in January 1983. The plans included three components: an archival library for researchers, a museum for the general public, and a "Center for Public Affairs" which would serve as a think tank to promote the ideas of the Reagan Foundation. Negotiations were undertaken between Stanford's Kennedy and Reagan's adviser Edwin Meese III. In June 1983, Kennedy called for Stanford faculty to express their opinions through the Rosse Committee, to report by October. Professor John Manley accused the Hoover Institution of right-wing bias, and said that Stanford's reputation for objectivity would suffer from partisanship. The Rosse Committee reported both the negative and the positive aspects of the proposed library, and Stanford's Board of Trustees approved the location in December 1983. The agreement was announced in February 1984. Local opposition heightened after that, and a student group was formed to publicize the negative aspects, shocking their readers with fearful images of scholarly Stanford turning into a political "Reagan University". This polarized response was compared in the press to the Nixon Foundation's difficulties at Duke. A recurring point of contention was the Center for Public Affairs; some critics announced they would only approve the project if the think tank was removed or relocated offsite. Nancy Reagan insisted that the three components were indivisible, that she would not consider any suggestion of splitting up the proposal.

Because of continued concerns about partisan politics, the library plans were canceled by Stanford in 1987. The site in Simi Valley was chosen the same year.

Design

New York design agency Donovan/Green was contracted to design the facility's interior and exhibition spaces with partner Nancye Green overseeing the project. Construction of the library began in 1988, and the center was dedicated on November 4, 1991. At the time of its dedication, it was the largest presidential library. The dedication ceremonies were the first time in United States history that five United States presidents gathered together in the same place: Richard Nixon, Gerald Ford, Jimmy Carter, Ronald Reagan himself, and George H. W. Bush. Six First Ladies also attended: Lady Bird Johnson, Pat Nixon, Betty Ford, Rosalynn Carter, Nancy Reagan, and Barbara Bush. Only Former First Lady Jacqueline Kennedy Onassis did not attend; but, her children Caroline Kennedy Schlossberg and John F. Kennedy Jr. were in attendance along with Luci Johnson Turpin, younger daughter of President Lyndon B. Johnson, as well as descendants of Franklin D. Roosevelt.

Facilities
As a presidential library administered by the National Archives and Records Administration (NARA), the Reagan Library, under the authority of the Presidential Records Act, is the repository of presidential records for Reagan's administration. Holdings include 50 million pages of presidential documents, over 1.6 million photographs, a half-million feet of motion picture film and thousands of audio and video tapes. The library also houses personal papers collections including documents from Reagan's eight years as Governor of California.

It held that title until the dedication of the William J. Clinton Presidential Center and Park in Little Rock, Arkansas, on November 18, 2004. With the opening of the  Air Force One Pavilion in October 2005, the Reagan Library reclaimed the title in terms of physical size; however, the Clinton Library remains the largest presidential library in terms of materials (documents, artifacts, photographs, etc.). Like all presidential libraries since that of Franklin D. Roosevelt, the Reagan Library was built entirely with private donations, at a cost of $60 million (equivalent to $ in ). Major donors included Walter Annenberg, Lew Wasserman, Lodwrick Cook, Joe Albritton, Rupert Murdoch, Richard Sills, and John P. McGovern. For fiscal year 2007, the Reagan Library had 305,331 visitors, making it the second-most-visited presidential library, following the Lyndon B. Johnson Library; that was down from its fiscal year 2006 number of 440,301 visitors, when it was the most visited library.

In the 2019 Easy Fire, the Ronald Reagan Presidential Library had to be evacuated and was almost completely surrounded by the fire. Earlier the same year, the brush around the buildings had been cleared by goats to create a defensible space, which helped save the facilities from burning down, according to a firefighter. Olive trees used in the landscaping were damaged along with residential banners lining the access road. A major item in the estimated half a million dollars of damage was an internet and cable box that took down the library's network.

Exhibits and scenery

The museum features continually changing temporary exhibits and a permanent exhibit covering President Reagan's life. This exhibit begins during Reagan's childhood in Dixon, Illinois, and follows his life through his film career and military service, marriage to Nancy Davis Reagan, and political career. The "Citizen Governor" gallery shows footage of Reagan's 1964 "A Time for Choosing" speech and contains displays on his eight years as governor. The gallery includes a 1965 Ford Mustang used by Reagan during his first gubernatorial campaign, as well as the desk he used as governor. His 1980 and 1984 presidential campaigns are also highlighted, as well as his inauguration suit and a table from the White House Situation Room is on display. News footage of the 1981 assassination attempt on his life is shown, and information about the proposed Strategic Defense Initiative (SDI, dubbed "Star Wars") is included.

A full-scale replica of the Oval Office—a feature of most presidential libraries—is a prominent feature of this museum as well. Among the items Reagan kept on the Resolute desk, which is replicated in the exhibit, was a  copy of a bronze statue of "Old Bill Williams", by B. R. Pettit; Williams was a renowned mountain man of Arizona. Other parts of the exhibit focus on Reagan's ranch, the presidential retreat Camp David, life in the White House, and First Lady Nancy Reagan. An example of a temporary exhibit that ran from November 10, 2007, to November 10, 2008, was titled "Nancy Reagan: A First Lady's Style" and had featured over 80 designer dresses belonging to Nancy Reagan.

The hilltop grounds provide expansive views of the area, a re-creation of a portion of the White House Lawn, and a piece of the Berlin Wall. An F-14 Tomcat (BuNo 162592) is also located on the grounds.

In February 2016, a large equestrian statue of President Reagan was installed in front of the Air Force One Pavilion. Entitled "Along the Trail", it depicts Reagan riding his favorite horse, El Alamein. An earlier bronze entitled "Begins the Trail", both by sculptor Donald L. Reed, stands in Dixon, Illinois.

Artifacts controversy
On November 8, 2007, Reagan Library National Archives officials reported that due to poor record-keeping, they are unable to say whether approximately 80,000 artifacts have been stolen or are lost inside the museum complex. A "near-universal" security breakdown was also blamed, leaving the artifacts vulnerable to theft. Many of the nation's presidential libraries claim to be understaffed and underfunded. NARA labeled the Reagan Library as having the most serious problems with its inventory. In an audit, U.S. Archivist Allen Weinstein blamed the library's poor inventory software for the mishap. Frederick J. Ryan Jr., president of the Ronald Reagan Presidential Foundation's board of directors, said the allegations of poor management practices at the library reflect badly on the National Archives. The library has undertaken an inventory project that will take years to complete.

Air Force One Pavilion

A  exhibit hangar serves as the setting for the permanent display of the Boeing 707 aircraft used as Air Force One during Reagan's administration. The aircraft, SAM 27000, was also used by six other presidents in its active service life from 1973 until 2001, including Richard Nixon during his second term, Gerald Ford, Jimmy Carter, George H. W. Bush, Bill Clinton, and George W. Bush. In 1990, it became a backup aircraft after the Boeing 747s entered into service and was retired in 2001. The aircraft was flown to San Bernardino International Airport in September 2001, where it was presented to the Reagan Foundation. In what was known as Operation Homeward Bound, Boeing, the plane's manufacturer, disassembled the plane and transported it to the library in pieces. The pavilion was dedicated on October 24, 2005, by Nancy Reagan, President George W. Bush and First Lady Laura Bush.

SAM 27000 is part of a comprehensive display about presidential travel that also includes a Johnson-era Sikorsky VH-3 Sea King, call sign Marine One, and a presidential motorcade—Reagan's 1984 presidential parade limousine, a 1982 Los Angeles Police Department police car (as well as two 1980s police motorcycles), and a 1986 Secret Service vehicle used in one of President Reagan's motorcades in Los Angeles. The pavilion is also home to the original O'Farrell's pub from Ballyporeen in the Republic of Ireland that President and Mrs. Reagan visited in June 1984, now called the "Ronald Reagan Pub". Also featured are exhibits on the Cold War and Reagan's extensive travels aboard Air Force One.

On June 9, 2008, Secretary of Education Margaret Spellings joined Nancy Reagan to dedicate the Reagan Library Discovery Center, located in the Air Force One Pavilion. The center is an interactive youth exhibit in which fifth through eighth grade students participate in role-playing exercises based on events of the Reagan administration.

The pavilion has been used on several occasions as the venue for televised Republican Party primary-related debates (see below).

Center for Public Affairs
The Reagan Library has hosted many events, including the funeral of Ronald Reagan in June 2004, and the first Republican presidential candidates' debate of the 2008 primaries. On May 23, 2007, Secretary of State Condoleezza Rice and Australian Foreign Minister Alexander Downer held a brief private talk and a press conference. On July 17, 2007, Polish President Lech Kaczyński presented Poland's highest distinction, the Order of the White Eagle, to Mrs. Reagan on behalf of her husband.

Ronald Reagan's funeral

Following his death, Reagan's casket was driven by hearse to the Reagan Library on June 7, 2004, from Point Mugu through a  procession down Las Posas Road to U.S. Highway 101. Many people lined the streets and freeway overpasses to pay final respects. A memorial service was held in the library lobby with Nancy Reagan, Reagan's children, close relatives, and friends. The Reverend Dr. Michael Wenning officiated at the service.

From June 7 to 9, Reagan's casket lay in repose in the library lobby, where approximately 105,000 people viewed the casket to pay their respects. After flying the body to Washington, D.C., lying in state in the Capitol rotunda, and a national funeral service in the Washington National Cathedral, Reagan's casket was brought back to the library in California for a last memorial service and interment.

Construction plans for the library included a tomb for the eventual use of Reagan and his wife. Following a sunset service on the library grounds the previous evening, early on the morning of June 12, 2004, Reagan was laid to rest in the underground vault.

On March 6, 2016, Reagan's widow Nancy Reagan died at the age of 94 of congestive heart failure. After the funeral, she was buried next to her husband at the library on March 11, 2016.

Republican primary debates
On May 3, 2007, the Ronald Reagan Presidential Foundation and Nancy Reagan hosted the first 2008 Republican primary debate in the library's Air Force One Pavilion. The candidates present included Kansas senator Sam Brownback, former Virginia governor Jim Gilmore, former New York City mayor Rudy Giuliani, former Arkansas governor Mike Huckabee, representative Duncan Hunter of California, senator John McCain of Arizona, representative Ron Paul of Texas, former Massachusetts governor Mitt Romney, representative Tom Tancredo of Colorado, and Tommy Thompson, former governor of Wisconsin and President George W. Bush's first secretary of Health and Human Services. Mrs. Reagan, California governor Arnold Schwarzenegger, and Fred Ryan, chairman of the Ronald Reagan Presidential Foundation were among those in attendance. Candidates discussed the Iraq War, the War on Terror, taxes, healthcare, abortion, stem-cell research, gay rights, illegal immigration, and made at least 20 references to Ronald Reagan and his presidency.

On January 30, 2008, after the Republican candidates were narrowed to four—Romney, Huckabee, Paul, and McCain—the library was the scene of the final GOP debate, once again hosted by the Reagan Foundation and Mrs. Reagan.

The library announced that it would once again host the first Republican primary debate among 2012 Republican candidates, initially scheduled for May 2, 2011, but later postponed it until after other debates. The debate was co-hosted by NBC News and Politico. The debate took place on September 7, 2011.

In September 2015, the library hosted the second Republican presidential debate of the 2015-2016 cycle, run by CNN. 15 candidates took part in two sessions.

Centennial and library renovation
The Ronald Reagan Presidential Foundation and General Electric (GE) announced a partnership beginning March 17, 2010, to support the two-year-long celebration of President Reagan's 100th birthday on February 6, 2011. GE, for whom Reagan hosted General Electric Theater and served as a goodwill ambassador from 1954 to 1962, prior to being elected Governor of California, served as the Presenting Sponsor of the historic Reagan Centennial Celebration.

GE's overall participation as Presenting Sponsor of the Ronald Reagan Centennial Celebration included:
$10 million in the form of cash, advertising and promotion to support the Ronald Reagan Centennial Celebration, including funds to support the completely transformed, state-of-the-art museum at the Reagan Library that will be unveiled on February 5, 2011. This will include a new General Electric Theater that will focus on Reagan's career in radio, television, and film.
An additional $5 million to the Reagan Presidential Foundation to launch and support the GE–Reagan Scholars Program, an effort that will begin in 2011 and that will provide 200 four-year college scholarships over the next decade to "students who embody the vision and values personified by President Reagan."
A donation from GE/NBC Universal to the Reagan Foundation of 208 restored episodes of General Electric Theater in which Ronald Reagan hosted or appeared from 1954 until 1962. The episodes, many of which were thought to be lost and some of which were damaged, were recently uncovered and restored to broadcast quality for purposes of the renovated Reagan Museum.
An ad campaign and interactive Internet presence on GE's web site to promote the centennial and celebrate Reagan's political career and time with GE.
A series of public affairs lectures with Reagan-era luminaries that focused on Reagan's legacy.

The Reagan Centennial was also being led by the National Youth Leadership Committee. Notable members of the Committee include chairpersons Nick Jonas, Jordin Sparks and Austin Dillon, as well as famous non-chairpersons, including actress Anna Maria Perez de Tagle, Olympic bronze medalist Bryon Wilson, Olympian and X-Games medalist Hannah Teter, and recording artist Jordan Pruitt. Several other Olympians and athletes are also members of the committee.

See also

Mount McCoy
 Presidential Records Act
 Presidential memorials in the United States

References

External links

The Ronald Reagan Presidential Foundation and Library
The Ronald Reagan Centennial Celebration
Video of the dedication of the Ronald Reagan Presidential Library, 1991
Video of the Gravesite of Ronald Reagan at the Ronald Reagan Presidential Library
Video of the Replica of the Oval Office at the Ronald Reagan Presidential Library
U.S. National Archives and Records Administration

Library buildings completed in 1991
Monuments and memorials to Ronald Reagan
Museums in Ventura County, California
Reagan, Ronald
Presidential museums in the United States
Biographical museums in California
Culture of Simi Valley, California
Buildings and structures in Simi Valley, California
Libraries in Ventura County, California
1991 establishments in California
Tombs of presidents of the United States
Cemeteries in Ventura County, California